Marie Meiselman Shear (1940 – December 2017), also known as Marie Shear Meiselman, was an American writer and feminist activist, known for her definition of feminism as "The radical notion that women are people."

Early life 
Marie Shear Meiselman majored in English at Brooklyn College, and graduated in 1964.

Career 
Shear described herself as a "widely unheralded writer & editor". She was an active member of the National Writers Union and the Brooklyn chapter of the National Organization for Women. For eight years, Shear wrote a satirical column in New Directions for Women entitled "Shear Chauvinism". She also wrote opinion and advice essays for Ms. Magazine and the San Francisco Examiner, and contributed to The Women's Review of Books.

Shear coined the phrase "Feminism is the radical notion that women are people" in her review of A Feminist Dictionary in New Directions for Women in 1986. It appears as one of over thirty additional definitions created by Shear as a 'toast' to the compilers of the dictionary, which has led to its misattribution to those compilers (Cheris Kramarae, Paula A. Treichler, and Ann Russo).

Personal life 
Shear died in late December 2017, in her seventies.

References

Further reading 
 'Shear, Marie' in Barbara J. Love (editor), Feminists Who Changed America, 1963-1975 (University of Illinois Press, 2006)
 Deborah Cameron, 'Radical notions', Language: A Feminist Guide (January 26, 2019)

American feminist writers
20th-century American women writers
1940 births
2017 deaths
Pages with unreviewed translations
Brooklyn College alumni
National Organization for Women people
21st-century American women writers
Writers from Brooklyn
Activists from New York City